Lampugnani is a surname. Notable people with the surname include:

 Gian Giacomo Lampugnani (active 2nd decade 16th century), Italian painter of the Renaissance
 Giovanni Andrea Lampugnani (died 1476), member of the Milanese nobility
 Giovanni Battista Lampugnani (c.1708–1786), Italian composer
 Vittorio Magnago Lampugnani (b.1951), Italian architect

Italian-language surnames